Request Concert is a 1955 West German musical comedy film directed by Erik Ode and starring Germaine Damar, Georg Thomalla and Renate Holm. It was shot at the Bendestorf Studios and on location in nearby Hamburg. The film's sets were designed by the art directors Max Mellin and Wolf Englert.

Cast
 Georg Thomalla as 	Willy Vogel
 Germaine Damar as 	Inge
 Renate Holm as 	Renate Holm
 Paul Dahlke as Knoll
 Bully Buhlan as Bully Buhlan
 Walter Gross as Lüdecke
 Peter W. Staub as 	Fireman, guitarist
 Harald Juhnke as 	Horn
 Peer Schmidt as Ad man, pianist
 Macky Kaspar as Brown, trumpeter 
 Kurt Vespermann as 	Steinberg
 Erica Beer as 	Knoll's wife
 Inge Meysel as Cleaning lady
 Linda Caroll as 	Knoll's mistress
 Josef Dahmen as Fire chief
 Peter Frankenfeld as 	Peter Frankenfeld

References

Bibliography 
 Manfred Hobsch. Liebe, Tanz und 1000 Schlagerfilme. Schwarzkopf & Schwarzkopf, 1998.

External links 
 

1955 films
1955 musical comedy films
German musical comedy films
West German films
1950s German-language films
Films directed by Erik Ode
German black-and-white films
1950s German films
Films shot in Hamburg